North Augusta is a city in Aiken and Edgefield counties in the U.S. state of South Carolina, on the north bank of the Savannah River. The population was 24,379 at the 2020 census. The city is included in the Central Savannah River Area (CSRA) and is part of the Augusta, Georgia, metropolitan area.

History
The city was incorporated in 1906 and sprouted from the pre-Civil War city of Hamburg. The original land area was approximately 772 acres. James U. Jackson was the city's primary visionary. He traveled to New York several times to receive financial support for the town and built the Thirteenth Street/ Georgia Avenue Bridge (James U. Jackson Memorial Bridge).

In the early 20th century North Augusta was a popular vacation spot for northerners. Its popularity stemmed from its railroad connections and climate. In the Mid 20th century after the atomic bomb and during the Cold War, the city's population nearly quadrupled because the Savannah River Plant was constructed south of town. During this period the area of North Augusta increased from 772 acres to 5,139 acres.

The Georgia Avenue-Butler Avenue Historic District, Charles Hammond House, Lookaway Hall, Britton Mims Place, Rosemary Hall and B.C. Wall House are listed on the National Register of Historic Places.

North Augusta is also notable for nearby Murphy Village, a community of about 2,500 Irish Travelers that was featured on a 2012 episode of the TLC show, My Big Fat American Gypsy Wedding.

SRP Park
SRP Park is located in North Augusta along the Savannah River. SRP Park is the home of the Augusta GreenJackets, the Single-A affiliate of the Atlanta Braves.

Riverview Park Activities Center
The Riverview Park Activities Center is the host site for Nike's annual premier summer events, the Nike Peach Jam (boys) and the Nike Nationals (girls). The nation's top high school basketball prospects and college coaches gather in North Augusta each year for the tournaments.

Geography
North Augusta is located in western Aiken County at  (33.512935, -81.962640). A small part of the city extends north into Edgefield County.

Highways

Education
North Augusta public schools includes two high schools, North Augusta High School and Fox Creek High School. North Augusta High School is in Aiken County and operates under the Aiken County School District. Fox Creek is an independent charter school.

Two middle schools, Paul Knox Middle School and North Augusta Middle School, and four elementary schools (Hammond Hill Elementary, Belvedere Elementary, North Augusta Elementary, and Mossy Creek Elementary), serve the community. Local private schools include Our Lady of Peace Catholic Church, Victory Baptist Church, and kindergartens at Grace United Methodist Church and First Baptist Church North Augusta.  Many students attend private schools across the river in Georgia, at Aquinas High School, Augusta Preparatory Day School, Augusta Christian, Curtis Baptist, Episcopal Day School, Saint Mary on the Hill Catholic School, and Westminster Schools of Augusta.

North Augusta has a public library, a branch of the ABBE Regional Library System.

Demographics

2020 census

As of the 2020 United States census, there were 24,379 people, 9,754 households, and 6,461 families residing in the city.

2010 census
As of the census of 2010, there were 21,348 people, 9,003 households, and 4,764 families residing in the city. The racial makeup of the city was 74.2% White, 20.4% African American, 0.3% Native American, 1.1% Asian, 0.04% Pacific Islander, 2% from other races, and 2% from two or more ethnic groups. Hispanic or Latino of any race were 4.2% of the population.

In 2000, there were 7,330 households, out of which 32.5% had children under the age of 18 living with them, 48.8% were married couples living together, 13.0% had a female householder with no husband present, and 35.0% were non-families. 30.5% of all households were made up of individuals, and 10.6% had someone living alone who was 65 years of age or older. The average household size was 2.35 and the average family size was 2.96.

In the city, the population was spread out, with 25.2% under the age of 18, 8.4% from 18 to 24, 30.8% from 25 to 44, 21.3% from 45 to 64, and 14.2% who were 65 years of age or older. The median age was 36 years. For every 100 females, there were 88.5 males. For every 100 females age 18 and over, there were 84.4 males.

The median income for a household in the city was $45,600, and the median income for a family was $58,472. Males had a median income of $42,089 versus $28,790 for females. The per capita income for the city was $23,099. About 9.8% of families and 11.0% of the population were below the poverty line, including 16.6% of those under age 18 and 10.7% of those age 65 or over.

Notable people
 Scott Brown - professional golfer on the PGA Tour
 Matthew Campbell - former NFL player
 Cecil L. Collins, former mayor 
 Tyler Colvin - first round MLB draft pick by Chicago Cubs, currently with San Francisco Giants
 Matt Hazel - current NFL player for the Miami Dolphins and former Coastal Carolina standout
 Perry Holloway - former U.S. Ambassador
 Sharon Jones - soul singer
 Fred Vinson - former college football All-American at Vanderbilt, former NFL player
 Charlie Waters - former NFL player for Dallas Cowboys, recognized by ESPN as one of the "50 Greatest Cowboys"
 Rhett Walker - Christian Singer

References

External links
 City of North Augusta official website

 
Augusta metropolitan area
Cities in Aiken County, South Carolina
Cities in Edgefield County, South Carolina
Cities in South Carolina
Irish-American culture in South Carolina
Irish Travellers